The 2015 Miami Beach Bowl was a post-season American college football bowl game played on December 21, 2015 at Marlins Park in Miami, Florida.  The second edition of the Miami Beach Bowl featured the champions from Conference USA, the Western Kentucky Hilltoppers against the South Florida Bulls of the American Athletic Conference. It began at 2:30 p.m. EST and air on ESPN.  It was one of the 2015–16 bowl games that concluded the 2015 FBS football season.

Teams
The game featured the Western Kentucky Hilltoppers against the South Florida Bulls.  It was the seventh overall meeting between these two teams, with South Florida leading the series 4–2 before this game.  The last meeting between these two teams was in 2010, when the Bulls beat the Hilltoppers 24–12 in Tampa.

South Florida Bulls

Sources told ESPN reporter Brett McMurphy that the Bulls had officially been invited to the game and accepted.

This was the Bulls' seventh bowl game (they were previously 4–2 all-time in bowl games) and their first since winning the 2010 Meineke Car Care Bowl over Clemson by a score of 31–26.  It was also the Bulls' first bowl game in Florida since winning the 2008 St. Petersburg Bowl (said game's inaugural edition) over Memphis by a score of 41–14.

Western Kentucky Hilltoppers

Game summary

Scoring Summary

Source:

Statistics

References

Miami Beach Bowl
Miami Beach Bowl
South Florida Bulls football bowl games
Western Kentucky Hilltoppers football bowl games
December 2015 sports events in the United States
Miami Beach Bowl